Tangab-e Sardar (also Romanized as Tangāb-e Sardār; also known as Tangāb) is a village in Sepidar Rural District, in the Central District of Boyer-Ahmad County, Kohgiluyeh and Boyer-Ahmad Province, Iran. At the 2006 census, its population was 27, in 8 families.

References 

Populated places in Boyer-Ahmad County